Paul Hilland (born 28 July 1983) is a Scottish association football player, who played for several clubs in the Scottish Premier League and Scottish Football League.

Hilland broke into the Hibs first team squad for the same time as Derek Riordan, and they were both loaned to Cowdenbeath during the 2002–03 season. Hilland played in three SPL games for Hibs, all towards the end of the 2001–02 season, when manager Bobby Williamson gave an opportunity to younger players while two senior players (Ian Murray and Ulrik Laursen) were injured. Hilland was one of many players released by Hibs during the 2003 close season, as the club sought to cut their wage bill significantly.

After being released by Hibs, Hilland moved between several SFL clubs, including Berwick Rangers, Queen of the South and Raith Rovers, the latter of whom he joined on a loan deal from Clyde. Hilland eventually moved into the junior leagues, although he briefly emigrated to Australia.

On 4 October 2013, Hilland signed for Linlithgow Rose.

References

External links

1983 births
Arthurlie F.C. players
Association football defenders
Berwick Rangers F.C. players
Clyde F.C. players
Cowdenbeath F.C. players
Hibernian F.C. players
Irvine Meadow XI F.C. players
Linlithgow Rose F.C. players
Living people
Queen of the South F.C. players
Raith Rovers F.C. players
Scottish expatriates in Australia
Scottish Football League players
Scottish footballers
Scottish Junior Football Association players
Scottish Premier League players